The following is a list of mayors of the city of Salvador, Bahia state, Brazil.

See also
 
 Timeline of Salvador, Bahia
 List of Governors of Bahia
 
 List of mayors of largest cities in Brazil (in Portuguese)
 List of mayors of capitals of Brazil (in Portuguese)

References

This article incorporates information from the Portuguese Wikipedia.

People from Salvador, Bahia
salvador
salvador